Sarah Klau (born 30 September 1994) is an Australian netball player in the Suncorp Super Netball league, playing for the New South Wales Swifts.

Career
Klau began her netball career for the Adelaide Thunderbirds in 2016, before moving to the New South Wales Swifts for the inaugural season of the new Suncorp Super Netball league. She impressed in her debut match in round 1 and went on to feature consistently in the Swifts backline team. She was selected in the Australian Diamonds squad for the 2018/19 international season.

References

External links
 Super Netball profile

Australian netball players
Adelaide Thunderbirds players
New South Wales Swifts players
Living people
1994 births
Netball players at the 2022 Commonwealth Games
Commonwealth Games gold medallists for Australia
Commonwealth Games medallists in netball
2019 Netball World Cup players
Suncorp Super Netball players
Australian Netball League players
Southern Force (netball) players
Netball players from South Australia
Australia international netball players
People educated at Immanuel College, Adelaide
South Australian Sports Institute netball players
New South Wales Institute of Sport netball players
Medallists at the 2022 Commonwealth Games